This is a list of the most notable films produced in Cinema of Germany between 1945 and 1959.

For an alphabetical list of articles on West German films see :Category:West German films.

Missing films may be Austrian productions.

1946

1947

1948

1949

References

1945
Lists of 1940s films
Films